People with the name of Hagnon or Agnon (in Greek: Ἅγνων) include:

Hagnon of Peparethus, ancient Greek athlete, victor in the stadion race of the 53rd Olympiad (568 BC)
Hagnon, son of Nikias, 5th century BC, Athenian general and statesman
Hagnon of Tarsus, 2nd century BC, ancient Greek rhetorician and philosopher
Shmuel Yosef Agnon, (1888-1970), Nobel Prize laureate writer of modern Hebrew fiction